Dinosaur is the twentieth studio album by the Japanese rock duo B'z. It was released on 29 November 2017. It came after a hiatus in which the members released solo projects, including vocalist/lyricist Koshi Inaba's collaborative album with Stevie Salas, Chubby Groove, and guitarist/composer Tak Matsumoto's solo effort enigma and collaborative studio album with Daniel Ho Electric Island, Acoustic Sea.

It debuted at #1 at the Oricon weekly albums chart, the Billboard Japan album chart and the Billboard Japan Download Albums chart. By the end of the year, it appeared at #18 at the Oricon 2017 year-end chart.

The title track was featured at the Japanese dub of 2017 natural disaster film Geostorm. "King of the Street" was featured in Koei video game, Dynasty Warriors 9 soundtrack.

Track listing

Bonus Live CD & DVD / CD & Blu-ray
This bonus CD features the band's whole show at Rock in Japan Festival 2017

 "Samayoeru Aoi Dangan"
 "Liar! Liar!"
 "Sayonara Kizu Darake no Hibi yo"
 "Uchōten"
 "Hadashi no Megami"
 "Ichibu to Zenbu"
 "Still Alive"
 "Shoudou"
 "juice"
 "Giri Giri Chop"
 "Ultra Soul"

Personnel 
B'z
 Koshi Inaba - vocals
 Tak Matsumoto - guitars

Session members
Yukihide "YT" Takiyama – backing vocals on tracks 7, 8, 10, 12
 Sam Pomanti – backing vocals on "Skyrocket" and "Rooftop"
 Barry Sparks – bass on tracks 1, 5, 8, 9, 10, 11, 12, 13
 Chris Chaney – bass on tracks 1, 2, 6
 Steve Billman – bass on  "Haruka" and "Queen of the Night"
 Travis Carlton – bass "Still Alive"
 Jeff Babko – keyboards on all tracks except "Still Alive"
 Shane Gaalaas – drums on tracks 3, 4, 5, 7, 10, 11, 13
 Tommy Clufetos – drums on tracks 1, 2, 6, 8, 9, 12
 Nobu Saito – percussion on tracks 4, 5, 7, 8, 11, 12, 13 
 Lenny Castro – percussion on tracks 1, 2, 6
 Greg Vail – saxophone on "Yowai Otoko"

Production
Yukihide "YT" Takiyama – arrangement and recording on all tracks except "Still Alive"
Hideyuki Terachi – arrangement and vocal direction on "Still Alive"
Hiroyuki Kobayashi – recording and mixing

Charts

Weekly charts

Year-end charts

Certifications

References

External links 
 Dinosaur at B'z official website

2017 albums
B'z albums
Being Inc. albums
Japanese-language albums